Yegor Semenov (born 6 January 1988) is a Belarusian professional footballer who plays for Smorgon.

He suspended his career during 2006–2009 due to health issues, but later recovered.

References

External links 
 
 

1988 births
Living people
Belarusian footballers
Association football defenders
FC Smena Minsk players
FC Smolevichi players
FC Klechesk Kletsk players
FC Smorgon players
FC Krumkachy Minsk players
FC Luch Minsk (2012) players
FC Slutsk players